Adam Craig (born August 15, 1981, in Bangor, Maine) is a professional mountain biker currently living in Bend, Oregon. Originally from Corinth, Maine, Craig was educated at the University of Maine. He is a three-time Under 23 Cross-country National Champion, 2007 and 2008 National Champion, and represented the United States at the 2008 Beijing Olympic Games.

Adam Craig competed in several events at the 2013 Sea Otter Classic using a Mongoose Beast, a 47 lb singlespeed fatbike sold for $200 at Walmart. Craig gave interviews under the pseudonym Manuel Beastley and competed wearing Giant Factory Team casual apparel.

See also
 Cycling at the 2008 Summer Olympics – Men's cross-country

References

External links
 
 
 
 

1981 births
Living people
American male cyclists
Cross-country mountain bikers
Cyclists from Oregon
Cyclists at the 2007 Pan American Games
Cyclists at the 2008 Summer Olympics
Maine Black Bears athletes
Olympic cyclists of the United States
People from Corinth, Maine
Sportspeople from Bangor, Maine
Sportspeople from Bend, Oregon
Pan American Games gold medalists for the United States
Pan American Games medalists in cycling
American mountain bikers
Medalists at the 2007 Pan American Games
Cyclists from Maine